Pamela Sheyne is a British songwriter, producer, mentor and singer best known for co-writing Christina Aguilera’s global smash debut single "Genie in a Bottle". She has achieved 50+ million record sales and over 100 RIAA Platinum, Gold and Silver Certified sales awards worldwide, an Ivor Novello Award along with seven BMI citations for US radio plays.

Biography
Sheyne was born in Auckland, New Zealand and moved to the United Kingdom in her late teens. She spent several years in London as a session singer and backing vocalist for artists including; Pet Shop Boys, Bryan Adams, Elton John, Celine Dion, Mike & The Mechanics, Tom Jones, Lulu, Daryl Hall, Cyndi Lauper, and Dave Stewart.

After initial success in the UK as songwriter with hits including Kavana’s No. 8 UK singles chart with “MFEO” and Billie's No. 3 UK single chart "She Wants You", Sheyne travelled to Los Angeles where she collaborated with David Frank and Steve Kipner to create what was to become her biggest hit song to date. "Genie in a Bottle" was Christina Aguilera’s first single, it achieved No. 1 Billboard single for five weeks and went on to reach No. 1 in 22 countries including the UK. The song won an Ivor Novello Award for ‘International Hit of the Year’ in the year in 1999 and Christina won a Grammy for Best Female Pop Vocal Performance for the same year.

Sheyne also co-wrote and sang background vocals on debut single "He Loves U Not" for girl group Dream which reached No. 2 on the Billboard Single's Chart as well as USA Soundscan No. 1 along with USA No. 15 hit for Jessica Simpson with "Irresistible". Her songs have been covered by a number of international artists including; Camila Cabello, Demi Lovato, Lindsay Lohan, Corrine Bailey Rae, Seal, Sinead O’Connor, Tina Arena, Laura Pausini, The Backstreet Boys, O Town, Jessica Simpson, Cece Winans and The Saturdays.

In the film and TV world, Sheyne has written end titles for Disney's ‘The Princess Diaries’, ‘Confessions of A Teenage Drama Queen’ and the Golden Globe nominated film ‘The Young Victoria’ . TV shows that have featured Sheyne's songs include ‘Hannah Montana’, ‘Jump In’, ‘Camp Rock’, ’Camp Rock 2’, ‘Sonny with a Chance’, ‘Lizzie Maguire’, ‘Beverly Hills 90210’, ‘Roswell’, ‘King of the Hill’, ‘American Idol’, ‘Canadian Idol’, ‘X Factor’, ‘The Voice’, ‘Good Morning America’, ‘Fame’ and ‘General Hospital’ to name but a few. Sheyne additionally wrote and sang the theme tune to NBC’s ‘Dance Your Ass Off’.

Sheyne is also a songwriting mentor and attends songwriting camps and retreats sharing her experience and talking about the craft of songwriting. She started SongWriterCamps with business partner Richard Harris in 2018 and is passionate about the craft of songwriting.  She is a founding member of SONA (Songwriters of North America) a grassroots advocacy group based in Los Angeles that campaigns for songwriter rights.

Discography
Sheyne is a credited contributor on the following songs or albums:
Billie Piper, "She Wants You" (1998)
Christina Aguilera, "Genie in a Bottle" (1999)
Angela Via, "I Don't Care" (2000)
Dream, "He Loves U Not" (2000)
Dream, "This Is Me" (2000)
Jessica Simpson, "Irresistible" (2001)
M2M, "Mirror Mirror" (2000)
Tina Arena, "If You Ever" (2001)
O-Town, "Craving" (2002)
Hayley Westenra, "Never Say Goodbye" (2004)
Corinne Bailey Rae, "Till It Happens to You" (2005)
Mutya Buena, "Just a Little Bit" (2007)
The Mrs, "Between the Sheets." (2013)
Elvis Blue, "Lighthouse" (2013)

References

External links
Official site

British songwriters
Living people
Year of birth missing (living people)